BVSC may refer to:
 Bachelor of Veterinary Science
 Buena Vista Social Club (disambiguation)
 Budapesti VSC